La Vita di Leonardo Da Vinci  — in English, The Life of Leonardo da Vinci  — is a 1971 Italian television miniseries dramatizing the life of the Italian Renaissance genius Leonardo da Vinci (1452–1519).

The Golden Globe-winning miniseries was directed by Renato Castellani, produced by RAI, Televisión Española, ORTF and Istituto Luce and distributed in the United States by CBS, which aired it from August 13, 1972 to September 10, 1972. Castellani wrote the screenplay. It was filmed entirely on location in Italy and France. The total runtime of the five episodes is nearly five hours.

Cast
 Philippe Leroy as Leonardo da Vinci adult
 Riad Gholmie as Francis I of France
 Giampiero Albertini as Ludovico Sforza
 Renzo Rossi as Sandro Botticelli
 Bruno Cirino as Michelangelo
 Marta Fischer as Isabella of Aragon
 Enrico Osterman as Niccolò Machiavelli
 Mario Molli as Andrea del Verrocchio
 Carlo Simoni as Francesco Melzi
 Bianca Toccafondi as Isabella d'Este
 Bruno Piergentili as Salaì (Gian Giacomo Caprotti)

Awards and nominations

Awards
1973 – Golden Globe – Best Television Special

Nominations
1973 – Emmy – Outstanding Continued Performance by an Actor in a Leading Role (Drama/Comedy – Limited Episodes); Philippe Leroy (CBS)
1973 – Emmy – Outstanding Drama/Comedy – Limited Episodes (CBS and Radiotelevisione Italiana (RAI) [executive producer]). For Parts I–V.

Alternate titles
Das Leben Leonardo da Vincis (West Germany; recut version)
I, Leonardo (USA)
The Life of Leonardo Da Vinci (USA)
Léonard de Vinci (France)
Жизнь Леонардо да Винчи (СССР)
Животът на Леонардо да Винчи (Bulgaria)
La vida de Leonardo Da Vinci (Venezuela)
Leonardo Da Vinci élete (Hungary, 4 January 1974)

Errors
In the English-dubbed narration, Ludovico Sforza's Milan is said to have fallen in 1499 to the French King Louis VII (reigned 1137–1180). The reference should be to Louis XII (reigned 1498–1515).

References

External links
 
La vita di Leonardo da Vinci on RaiPlay..

Italian television miniseries
Works about Leonardo da Vinci
Depictions of Leonardo da Vinci on television
Television series set in the 15th century
Television series set in the 16th century
Television series set in the Renaissance
1971 Italian television series debuts